Mihir Kumar Das (17 February 1959 – 11 January 2022) was an Indian actor who worked in Odia language films (Ollywood industry). He had received several awards, notably Best Actor for his films Laxmi Pratima in 1998 and Pheria Mo Suna Bhauni in 2005 Best Supporting Actor award for his films Rakhi Bandhili Mo Rakhiba Mana in 2002 and Prema Adhei Akhyara and Best Comedian award for Mu Tate Love Karuchhi in 2007 from the Odisha state government.

Life and career
Mihir Kumar Das was born in Mayurbhanj on 11 February 1959. He was married to singer and film artist Sangita Das, who died in 2010 due to heart attack. She was the daughter of the popular singer, Chitta Jena. Mihir Das and Sangita Das have two sons, the elder, Amlan Das who is also an actor and Aklant Das. He debuted in the Odia film industry with an art film School Master and then in commercial (non-art) film Mathura Bijay in 1979. He received wider applause and recognition for his performance in Pua Mora Bhola Sankara. A veteran actor for more than three decades, he received Best Actor award from the state government for his performance in movies Laxmi Protima in 1998 and Pheria Mo Suna Bhauni in 2005 and Best Comedian award for Mu Tate Love Karuchhi in 2007.

In December 2021, Das was hospitalized after having a heart attack while undergoing dialysis for a renal issue in Cuttack, India. He died while undergoing treatment at hospital in Cuttack on 11 January 2022, at the age of 62.

Filmography

Film awards
 Best Actor award for Pua Mora Bhola Sankara in 1996.
 Best Supporting Actor award for Soubhagyabati in 1997.
 Best Supporting Actor award for Laxmi Protima in 1998.
 Best Actor award for Bidhata in 1999.
 Best Supporting Actor award for Rakhi Bandhili Mo Rakhiba Mana in 2002.
 Best Actor award for Pheria Mo Suna Bhauni in 2005.
 Best Comedian award for Mu Tate Love Karuchi in 2007.
 Best Supporting Actor award for Prema Adhei Akhyara in 2010.

See also
 Orissa State Film Awards

References

External links
 Interview: Mihir Das

1959 births
2022 deaths
20th-century Indian male actors
21st-century Indian male actors
Cinema of Odisha
Indian male film actors
Male actors from Odisha
Male actors in Odia cinema
People from Baripada